

358001–358100 

|-bgcolor=#f2f2f2
| colspan=4 align=center | 
|}

358101–358200 

|-bgcolor=#f2f2f2
| colspan=4 align=center | 
|}

358201–358300 

|-bgcolor=#f2f2f2
| colspan=4 align=center | 
|}

358301–358400 

|-id=376
| 358376 Gwyn ||  || Stephen Gwyn (born 1968), an astronomer working for the Canadian Astronomy Data Centre || 
|}

358401–358500 

|-bgcolor=#f2f2f2
| colspan=4 align=center | 
|}

358501–358600 

|-bgcolor=#f2f2f2
| colspan=4 align=center | 
|}

358601–358700 

|-id=675
| 358675 Bente ||  || Bente Vandenbussche (born 2014) is the daughter of Bart Vandenbussche, a colleague of Belgian discoverer Peter De Cat || 
|}

358701–358800 

|-bgcolor=#f2f2f2
| colspan=4 align=center | 
|}

358801–358900 

|-id=894
| 358894 Demetrescu ||  || Gheorghe Demetrescu (1885–1969), a Romanian astronomer and mathematician || 
|}

358901–359000 

|-bgcolor=#f2f2f2
| colspan=4 align=center | 
|}

References 

358001-359000